WBFS may refer to:

WBFS-TV, a television station in Miami, Florida, United States
West Bengal Fire Service, India
.wbfs, a file format for storing Wii ROMs on external memory

See also
WBF (disambiguation)